Ortwin Depoortere (born 23 October 1970) is a Belgian politician for the Vlaams Belang party who has twice served as a member of the Chamber of Representatives for the VB. 

Depoortere was originally active in the NSV and then the former Vlaams Blok party. He was also a member of the Chamber of Representatives for the East Flanders electoral district from July 2004 until the 2007 elections for Vlaams Belang. In 2015, he was appointed to the Flemish Parliament to take over from former VB representative  Barbara Bonte who resigned due to personal reasons before taking her seat. In the 2019 Belgian federal election, Depoortere returned to the Chamber of Representatives.

References 

Living people
Vlaams Belang politicians
Flemish politicians
Members of the Belgian Federal Parliament
1970 births
People from Izegem